was a  after Shōan and before Kagen. This period spanned the years from November 1302 through August 1303.

Change of era
 1302 : The new era name was created to mark an event or a number of events. The previous era ended and a new one commenced in Shōan 4.

Events of the Kengen era
 1302 (Kengen 1, 16th day of the 6th month):Emperor Go-Nijo visited the home of retired Emperor Kameyama.
 1302 (Kengen 1): Major repairs and reconstruction at Yakushi-ji.

Notes

References
 Nussbaum, Louis-Frédéric and Käthe Roth. (2005).  Japan encyclopedia. Cambridge: Harvard University Press. ;  OCLC 58053128
 Titsingh, Isaac. (1834). Nihon Odai Ichiran; ou,  Annales des empereurs du Japon.  Paris: Royal Asiatic Society, Oriental Translation Fund of Great Britain and Ireland. OCLC 5850691
 Varley, H. Paul. (1980). A Chronicle of Gods and Sovereigns: Jinnō Shōtōki of Kitabatake Chikafusa. New York: Columbia University Press. ;  OCLC 6042764

External links
 National Diet Library, "The Japanese Calendar" -- historical overview plus illustrative images from library's collection

Japanese eras
1300s in Japan